East Chicago Transit is the provider of mass transportation in East Chicago, Indiana, an industrial suburb of Chicago, Illinois. Three routes are provided within the municipality's limits. Along with Hammond Transit, the Gary Public Transportation Corporation, and the Valpo V-Line, this agency is managed by its community government but run under the umbrella of the Northwest Indiana Regional Bus Authority. The bus service is partially funded through local casino revenues, and the service is free to all riders.

Routes
1 Griffith Plaza
2 Crosstown
3 West Calumet

References

External links
 Official ECT Website

Bus transportation in Indiana
Transportation in Lake County, Indiana
East Chicago, Indiana